Chemical colitis is a type of colitis, an inflammation of the large intestine or colon, caused by the introduction of harsh chemicals to the colon by an enema or other procedure. Chemical colitis can resemble ulcerative colitis, infectious colitis and pseudomembranous colitis endoscopically.

Prior to 1950, hydrogen peroxide enemas were commonly used for certain conditions. This practice will often result in chemical colitis.

Soap enemas may also cause chemical colitis.
Harsh chemicals, such as compounds used to clean colonoscopes, are sometimes accidentally introduced into the colon during colonoscopy or other procedures.  This can also lead to chemical colitis.

Chemical colitis may trigger a flare of ulcerative colitis or Crohn's colitis. Symptoms of colitis are assessed using the Simple Clinical Colitis Activity Index.

References

Inflammations
Colitis